The following highways are numbered 883:

Ireland
 R883 regional road

United States